Fazal Ellahi Khan (1 January 1933) is a Pakistani lawyer and a retired judge who served as the 9th chief justice of the Federal Shariat Court from 12 January 2000 to 11 January 2003 and the Supreme Court of Pakistan judge on 3 April 1993.

Biography 
Khan was born in Mardan, Pakistan. He graduated from Edwardes College Peshawar and the University of Peshawar in 1954. He obtained his Bachelor of Laws from Khyber Law College, University of Peshawar in 1956.

Khan started his legal practice in 1957 and was subsequently selected as advocate of the West Pakistan High Court on 24 June 1959 and advocate of the Supreme Court of Pakistan on 28 April
1976. He was later appointed as additional judge of the Peshawar High Court on 8 April 1982 and permanent Judge of 
the same Court on 8 April 1984. He also served as acting governor of governor of the North-West Frontier Province from 10 March to 16 March 1993. He became Supreme Court of Pakistan judge on 3 April 1993.

After serving as Supreme Court judge, he became a member of the Federal Public Service Commission from May 1998 to January 2000. Before his retirement on 11 January 2003, he served as chief justice of the Federal Shariat Court on 12 January 2000.

References 

Living people
1933 births
Chief justices of the Federal Shariat Court
Judges of the Peshawar High Court
Justices of the Supreme Court of Pakistan
20th-century Pakistani lawyers
Governors of Khyber Pakhtunkhwa
Edwardes College alumni
University of Peshawar alumni